Lior Haramaty (born in Tel-Aviv, Israel in 1966) is the co-founder of VocalTec Inc. (1989) and the inventor of the Audio Transceiver used in the creation of Voice Over Networks products and eventually the VoIP industry.

VocalTec was the first company to provide commercial Internet voice technology, which in 1996 was one of the earliest successful Internet IPOs (NASDAQ: vocl).

In 2006 Haramaty was included in TMCnet's Internet Telephony magazine "Top 100 Voices of IP communications" for his contributions to the VoIP industry. In 2005 he was awarded the "VON Visionary Award" by Pulver.com .

References

1966 births
Living people
People from Tel Aviv
Israeli Jews